The Rio Grande Valley League was a minor league baseball league, with franchises based exclusively in Texas. The Rio Grande Valley League had two incarnations, playing in 1931 and 1949 to 1950.

History

In 1931, the league initially featured the Corpus Christi Seahawks of Corpus Christi, the Harlingen Ladds of Harlingen, the McAllen Palms of McAllen and the San Benito Saints of San Benito. Corpus Christi moved to La Feria to become the La Feria Nighthawks in June. The league disbanded on July 30. McAllen finished in first place with a 55–37 record; they also won the league playoff against La Feria 3 games to 0. Johnny Rizzo, who played in the major leagues from 1938 to 1942, played for Corpus Christi/La Feria. Tex Covington managed McAllen.

The league returned as a Class D level circuit in 1949, featuring the Donna Cardinals of Donna, the Corpus Christi Aces, the Laredo Apaches of Laredo, the Brownsville Charros of Brownsville, the McAllen Giants and the Del Rio Cowboys of Del Rio. On June 6, Donna moved to Robstown to become the Robstown Cardinals. Charlie Engle managed Donna/Robstown for part of the season. Corpus Christi finished first in the standings and faced McAllen in the postseason, winning 4 games to 0. Brownsville matched against Laredo and won 4 games to 2. In the finals, Corpus Christi beat Brownsville 4 games to 0.

In 1950, the league became a  Class C level circuit. Laredo, Corpus Christi, Brownsville, McAllen and Del Rio returned from 1949. Robstown became the Robstown Rebels. Donna and Weslaco featured the Donna-Weslaco Twins. Harlingen featured the Harlingen Capitals. On May 4, Donna-Weslaco disbanded; Robstown did the same on May 13. The playoffs had first-place finisher Harlingen beating Brownsville 4 games to 2. and Corpus Christi beating Laredo 4 games to 1. In the finals, Corpus Christi beat Harlingen 4 games to 1. Notably, Sam Harshaney managed Harlingen, Leonardo Alanís and Jack Smith managed Laredo, John Davis managed Corpus Christi and Fabian Kowalik managed Robstown. Monty Stratton, Joe Koppe, Dick Midkiff and  Vicente Amor played in the league that year.

Cities represented 
 Brownsville, TX: Brownsville Charros 1949–1950
 Corpus Christi, TX: Corpus Christi Seahawks 1931; Corpus Christi Aces 1949–1950 
 Del Rio, TX: Del Rio Cowboys 1949–1950
 Donna, TX: Donna Cardinals 1949 
 Donna–Weslaco, TX: Donna-Weslaco Twins 1950
 Harlingen, TX: Harlingen Ladds 1931; Harlingen Capitols 1950 
 La Feria, TX: La Feria Nighthawks 1931 
 Laredo, TX: Laredo Apaches 1949–1950 
 McAllen, TX: McAllen Palms 1931; McAllen Giants 1949–1950 
 Robstown, TX: Robstown Cardinals 1949; Robstown Rebels 1950
 San Benito, TX: San Benito Saints 1931

Standings & statistics

1931 Rio Grande Valley League
schedule
 Corpus Christi (20–23) moved to La Feria June 5. La Feria played its home games at Harlingen. The league disbanded July 30. Playoff: McAllen 3 games, La Feria 0.

1949 Rio Grande Valley League
schedule
 Donna moved to Robstown June 6. Playoffs: Corpus Christi 4 games, McAllen 0; Brownsville 4 games, Laredo 2. Finals: Corpus Christi 4 games, Brownsville 0.

1950 Rio Grande Valley League
schedule
 Donna-Weslaco disbanded May 4; Robstown disbanded May 13. Playoffs: Harlingen 4 games, Brownsville 2; Corpus Christi 4 games, Laredo 1. Finals: Corpus Christi 4 games, Harlingen 1.

References
The Encyclopedia of Minor League Baseball: Second and Third Editions

Defunct minor baseball leagues in the United States
Baseball leagues in Texas